Rahayu binte Mahzam (Jawi: رحايو مهزم; born 1980) is a Singaporean politician who has been serving as Senior Parliamentary Secretary for Health and Senior Parliamentary Secretary for Law concurrently since 2022. A member of the governing People's Action Party (PAP), she has been the Member of Parliament (MP) representing the Bukit Batok East division of Jurong GRC since 2015.

A lawyer by profession, Rahayu specialises in civil litigation and family law. She made her political debut in the 2015 general election as part of a five-member PAP team contesting in Jurong GRC and won 79.3% of the vote.

Education 
Rahayu studied at Raffles Girls' School and Raffles Junior College before she went to the National University of Singapore's Faculty of Law, where she completed a Bachelor of Laws in 2003 and was called to the Bar in 2004.

Career 
Rahayu joined Heng, Leong & Srinivasan LLC as a partner in January 2008, specialising in civil litigation and family law. In 2013, she left practice and served as Deputy Registrar at the Syariah Court of Singapore before returning to practice in August 2015. She is also an Associate Mediator accredited by the Singapore Mediation Centre.

Political career 
Rahayu was announced as a People's Action Party (PAP) candidate on 20 August 2015 to join the five-member PAP team contesting in Jurong GRC during the 2015 general election. After the PAP team won with 79.29% of the vote against SingFirst, Rahayu became a Member of Parliament representing the Bukit Batok East ward of Jurong GRC. In 2017, she was part of the taskforce set up to implement tighter regulations on formula milk manufacturers.

During 2020 general election, Rahayu joined the five-member PAP team contesting in Jurong GRC again and they won with 74.62% of the vote against Red Dot United. Rahayu thus retained her parliamentary seat in Bukit Batok East and was appointed Parliamentary Secretary on 1 September 2020 at the Ministry of Health. 

On 15 May 2021, she received an additional appointment as Parliamentary Secretary at the Ministry of Communications and Information. Rahayu was promoted Senior Parliamentary Secretary at the Ministry of Health on 13 June 2022 with the Ministry of Law added to the portfolio, and relinquished the Communications and Information portfolio.

Personal life 
Rahayu is the eldest of three children and her parents were a security officer and a civil servant.

Rahayu is married to a civil servant and has a son.

References

External links 
 Rahayu Mahzam on Parliament of Singapore

1980 births
Living people
Members of the Parliament of Singapore
National University of Singapore alumni
People's Action Party politicians
Singaporean people of Malay descent
Singaporean women in politics
Singaporean Muslims
Raffles Junior College alumni
Raffles Girls' Secondary School alumni